Bernard Finn (June 4, 1907 – September 26, 1993) was a professional American football player who played running back for three seasons for the Newark Tornadoes, Staten Island Stapletons, and Chicago Cardinals.

1907 births
1993 deaths
American football running backs
Holy Cross Crusaders football players
Newark Tornadoes players
Staten Island Stapletons players
Chicago Cardinals players